Murdoch Dryden is a New Zealand rower. Dryden is the son of New Zealand Olympic rower Alistair Dryden and grandson of New Zealand amateur wrestling champion and Empire Games silver medallist Jim Dryden.

At the 1995 World Rowing Championships in Tampere, Finland, Dryden won a silver medal in the coxed four, with Chris White, Andrew Matheson, Chris McAsey, and Michael Whittaker as cox.

References

New Zealand male rowers
Year of birth missing (living people)
Living people
World Rowing Championships medalists for New Zealand